Loyalsock Volunteer Fire Company provides fire protection and emergency medical services (EMS) to Loyalsock Township, Pennsylvania. The fire company consists of volunteer and paid career firefighter and paramedics.

Founded in 1925, it is one of the oldest fire departments in Lycoming County, Pennsylvania.  it has five operational trucks and three ambulances. The Company was awarded a grant in 2009 to introduce a Crisis center van into the fleet. The vehicle can be used as a mobile headquarters in events such as a large structure fire, or mass casualty event such as a mass shooting or mass bombing. The vehicle is named the North Central Task Force Incident Management Unit but has normal Loyalsock Company decals on the exterior. The equipment is used by agencies all over the county and surrounding areas.

History
Loyalsock Volunteer Fire Company, Station 18, was founded on March 12, 1925 after continuous pressure by locals to adopt a fire company after multiple devastating fires in the area. A chemical tank mounted to a car donated by one of the members was used to answer alarms until suitable equipment was purchased. In 1927 the department purchased its first ever fire engine. In June 1940, a modern Mack pumper was purchased. The company purchased the lot for $22,000.00. A concrete block building was erected to serve as a storage room and bingo display stand as well as housing rest rooms. At a later date the company purchased additional lots to increase the carnival area. Two additions were made to the original building and a new permanent building was erected at the west end of the lot. In 1947 the department bought its first ambulance.

Expansion 
In 2008 the department saw a significant expansion mostly due to donations and $3 million in Pennsylvania state funding. The department received two new ambulance, along with new trucks and engines. Along with a $2.2 million expansion to the fire house, the house was expanded by about half, with the additions of a second floor, with weight room and training facility, large crew lounge, offices, kitchen and sleeping quarters.

SMART agreement 
In 2022 Loyalsock Volunteer Fire Co entered into a cooperative agreement with South Williamsport Fire Co to share manpower in a team called the Susquehanna Mutual Aid Regional Team or SMART for short. The Alliance provides four full time 40 hour per week firefighter/EMT's as well as 1 administrative position for over site. This agreement provides 2 paid firefighter/EMT's at each station during daytime hours.

Operations

Apparatus 

 Engine 18 – 2013 Spartan Toyne, six-man seating capacity the townships primary attack engine. Responds primarily first due to box alarms and still alarms within Loyalsock. Also responds county wide when needed. Also responds to technical rescues, serious medical calls and serious vehicle accidents.
 Rescue 18 – 1998 Sutphen, six-man seating capacity. Responds to vehicle accidents, technical rescues, search and rescue as well as box and still alarms.
 Tanker 18 – 1991 Sutphen, six-man seating capacity. Responds first due alongside Engine 18 for box and still alarms in the township. As well as second due for fire alarms county-wide.
 Mobile Air 18 – 2007 Freightliner, two-man seating. Responds automatically to second alarm box alarms county-wide.
 Brush 18 – 1996 GMC 3500, two-man seating. Responds to brush and small rubbish fires in the township. Responds to large brush fires county-wide.
 Special Unit 18 – 2020 Chevrolet 2500, five-man seating. Responds to still alarms, brush fires and provides traffic control for large scenes.
 MICU 18 – 2019 Freightliner, two-man seating. Staffed by career paramedics and emergency medical technicians. Responds automatically to all vehicle accidents, box alarms and still alarms. Responds to other medical calls in Loyalsock and surrounding areas.
 Ambulance 18 – 2021 Ford Super Duty, two-man seating. Responds second due in the township and used as back-up for MICU 18. Operates as Advanced life support or Basic life support depending on the crew operating.
 Ambulance 1–18 – 2019 Ford Super Duty, two-man seating. Responds as third due in the township and used as back up for Ambulance 18. Operates as advanced life support or basic life support depending on crew.
 Car 18 – 2013 Chevrolet Traverse, five-man seating. Duty officer vehicle.
 IMU 18 (Incident Management Unit) – two-man seating. Mobile command center with seating for 13. Briefing area, dispatching area, numerous telephones, radios and televisions. Responds to large scale incidents like search and rescue, mass shootings, barricaded gunman, aircraft down and other large scale trauma events

Rank structure

Coverage area 
The fire companies coverage area is diverse, in the southern area of the township along Interstate 180 is a heavily commercialized and residential in nature. This area is well hydranted. In the northern part of the township is rural with spratically placed homes, farmland and the occasional small housing development and are non hydranted areas. Beginning in 2022 due to a box card change and the partnership with the South Williamsport Fire Department in the created of the SMART agreement Loyalsock is also first due to box alarms in South Williamsport borough as well. In the departments first due are several bodies of water including the West Branch Susquehanna River, Loyalsock Creek and Lycoming Creek. The township also has numerous nursing home and assisted living facilities.

Staffing 
The company's fire staffing is combination volunteer and career. Paid staff work monday through friday in staggered shifts from eight in the morning until six in the evening supplemented by volunteers. Weekend and nighttime staffing is solely volunteer. EMS is similar apart from the 24/7 staffing on the MICU, the basic life support ambulances are staffed day time seven days a week, nightime calls are handled by volunteer members.

See also
 List of Pennsylvania fire departments

References

Government of Lycoming County, Pennsylvania
Fire departments in Pennsylvania
Organizations established in 1925